Youssou Diop (born 5 May 1980 in Ziguinchor, Senegal) is a Senegalese retired footballer.

England
Continuing his career at Kidderminster Harriers from August to November 2004, Diop was described as 'fast' and mobile' and was on target twice, with both goals coming in preseason, including a long shot to go down 2-1 to Gloucester. However, he refused treatment from physiotherapist Jim Conway despite receiving an injury at Grimsby's Blundell Park ground on 20 November. Conway stated that fans were making spurious claims about the incident, exaggerating the facts as a result.

References

External links 
 at Footballdatabase.eu 
 TFC Match Profile 
 Soccerbase Profile

French sportspeople of Senegalese descent
Notts County F.C. players
Kidderminster Harriers F.C. players
GSI Pontivy players
US Albi players
Blagnac FC players
French expatriate footballers
Senegalese footballers
Senegalese expatriate footballers
Association football forwards
Expatriate footballers in England
Toulouse FC players
Toulouse Rodéo FC players
Luzenac AP players
French footballers
1980 births
Living people